Københavns Skipperforening (lit.  "Copenhagen Skippers' Association"), formerly Københavns Skipperlav (Copenhagen Skippers' Guild), is an organisation for skippers in Copenhagen, Denmark. Its former headquarters at the corner of Bremerholm and Holmens Kanal, a brick building from 1796, was listed on the Danish registry of protected buildings and places by the Danish Heritage Agency on 23 December 1918 and was sold to Danske Bank in 1930. The association is now based at Australiensgade in Østerbro.

History
 
The Copenhagen Skippers' Guild was founded on 22 December 1634. The guild was to be consulted on all matters related to shipfaring to and from Copenhagen and also acted as a maritime court in connection with disputes.

The guild acquired a building at Lille Kongensgade 33 in 1665. It was a Renaissance-style building from 1605.

The guild changed its name to Københavns Skipperforening and a new set of statues was adopted in 1863. This happened in response to the new Maritime Trade Act of 1861 (' Sønæringslov af 1861''). The guild sold its building on Lille Kongensgade in 1804 and it was later demolished in 1881-82.

 
It was built for the merchant Christen Larsen in  1796. The building has six bays towards Bremerholm, a single-bay chamfered corner and seven bays towards Holmens Kanal. Danske Bank acquired the building 1930, and the Skippers' Association then moved to Australiensgade in Østerbro.

Aldermen

References

External links

 Official website

1634 establishments in Denmark
Maritime organizations
Organizations established in 1634
Organizations based in Copenhagen
Buildings and structures completed in 1796
Listed buildings and structures in Copenhagen